Northern Yacht Club is a yacht club in North Sydney, Nova Scotia (Canada).

The club has hosted the Snipe Western Hemisphere & Orient Championship in 1976, Worlds in 1979 and Junior Worlds in 1982.

External links
Website

Yacht clubs in Canada
Organizations based in Nova Scotia